Margit Makay (4 August 1891 – 6 November 1989) was a Hungarian film actress. She appeared in 30 films between 1912 and 1989.

Selected filmography
 Man of Gold (1919)
 Two Confessions (1957)
 Cats' Play (1972)
 141 Minutes from the Unfinished Sentence (1975)
 A Very Moral Night (1977)

External links

1891 births
1989 deaths
Hungarian film actresses
Hungarian silent film actresses
20th-century Hungarian actresses